Yvonne Lui Pui-Lam (born Lui Lai-Kwan ; born 1976) is a Hong Kong-based influencer, former Miss Hong Kong contestant and girlfriend of Joseph Lau, a Hong Kong-based billionaire, felon and fugitive.

Early life
Born in Hong Kong, Lui received her Bachelor of Science and PhD in Chemical Engineering from King's College at University of London.

Philanthropy 
Lui’s charitable goals focus on education, health and science, which are closely tied to her personal background and the interests of her two children.

In 2008, she was named executive vice-president of the executive committee of Youth Movement. The body encouraged grass root support of the Olympic Games, and participation in sporting events.  Lui established a disaster relief wing overseeing operations during earthquakes in Sichuan in 2008 and Chinghai in 2010.  She has also sponsored local medical and sanitation clinics for remote communities in Hebei Province.

She is a trustee of Peking University and the University of International Business and Economics (Beijing).

Since 2011, she has started to support the Beijing International Ballet and Choreography Competition (Beijing IBCC) and became the Vice President of the Oganisating Committee.  Beijing IBCC aims to provide another world-renowned platform for aspiring dancers, professionals and members of national ballet dance troupes to participate at this biennial event.  Judging panel of the most recent event in July 2019 included Julio Bocca (Artistic Director of Uruguay National Ballet).

In Hong Kong, Lui is Honorary President of Hong Kong Federation of Women, a non-profit organization of over 100,000 members that subsidises local organisations for women  as well as chairing several non-governmental organisations, such as acting as the Honorary Chairman of Hong Kong United Youth Association.

In 2013, Lui founded the Yvonne Lui Trust to encourage science and education initiatives within her community and beyond.

In 2017, she jointly launched the Lui-Walton Innovators Fellowship Programme with S. Robson Walton, chairman of the board (retired) for Walmart Stores and Conservation International, a global non-governmental organization promoting conservation and sustainability. The programme aims to recognise world leaders, first-in-class scientists and conservationists dedicated to saving nature and building a healthier and more productive planet. Christiana Figueres, former executive secretary of the United Nations Framework Convention on Climate Change; Ólafur Ragnar Grímsson, former president of Iceland and chairman of the Arctic Circle (organization); and Anote Tong, former president of Kiribati are among the ones awarded the fellowship so far.  Lui is a board member of Conservation International.

An environmentalist, Lui penned an op-ed article published in a Hong Kong newspaper, South China Morning Post, in 2017 urging concerted efforts in her community including the government to step up their efforts to tackle climate change.

In recent years, Lui has developed an interest in running and has been seen promoting the sports through her own experience and support in running-related charity events.

References

1977 births
Living people
Alumni of King's College London
Hong Kong philanthropists
Hong Kong real estate businesspeople
Hong Kong women in business
University of Toronto alumni